The Fighting Man is the second studio album by the English pagan metal band Forefather. It was recorded and mixed at The Croft, Surrey and released in 2000 on Angelisc Enterprises. In 2004 Karmageddon Media reissued the album with two bonus tracks.

Track listing

Personnel
Athelstan - guitars, bass, keyboards, drums
Wulfstan - vocals, guitars, bass, drums
Christian Andersson - cover art

2000 albums
Forefather albums
Karmageddon Media albums